Redbank (also spelled Red Bank) is an unincorporated community in western Douglas County, Missouri, United States. Redbank is located on Missouri State Route O at its junction with Route NN to the west. The community of Arden is to the north and Goodhope is to the south along Route O and Merritt lies to the southwest along Route T.

History
A post office called Redbank was established in 1891, and remained in operation until 1898. The community was named for the red soil near the original town site.

References

Unincorporated communities in Douglas County, Missouri
1891 establishments in Missouri
Unincorporated communities in Missouri